Carina Konrad (born 19 September 1982) is a German politician of the Free Democratic Party (FDP) who has been serving as a member of the Bundestag from the state of Rhineland-Palatinate since 2017.

Early life and career 
Konrad completed her studies with a degree in agricultural engineering (FH). She runs a farm with arable farming and cattle breeding with her family in Bickenbach in the Hunsrück. 

From the 2016 state elections until she moved to the Bundestag, she worked as chief of staff to Marco Weber in the State Parliament of Rhineland-Palatinate.

Political career 
Konrad became a member of the Bundestag in the 2017 elections, representing the Mosel/Rhein-Hunsrück district. In parliament, she serves as deputy chair of the Committee on Food and Agriculture. She is also a deputy member of the Committee for Family Affairs, Senior Citizens, Women and Youth. She is the spokesperson for viticulture policy of the FDP parliamentary group in the Bundestag.

In the negotiations to form a so-called traffic light coalition of the Social Democrats (SPD), the Green Party and the FDP following the 2021 federal elections, Konrad led her party's delegation in the working group on agriculture and nutrition; her co-chairs from the other parties were Till Backhaus and Renate Künast.

Since 2021, Konrad has been serving as one of six deputy chairpersons of the FDP parliamentary group under the leadership of its chairman Christian Dürr, where she oversees the group's activities on sustainability and infrastructure.

Political positions 
In her position as deputy chair in 2022, Konrad opposed a value-added tax increase aimed at increasing farm animal welfare. The proposed increase, brought forward by a government expert commission, would be used to fund the refurbishment of farm stables.

Other activities 
 Federal Network Agency for Electricity, Gas, Telecommunications, Post and Railway (BNetzA), Member of the Advisory Board (since 2022)

References

External links 

  
 Bundestag biography 
 

 

 

1982 births
Living people
Members of the Bundestag for Rhineland-Palatinate
Female members of the Bundestag
21st-century German women politicians
Members of the Bundestag 2017–2021
Members of the Bundestag 2021–2025
Members of the Bundestag for the Free Democratic Party (Germany)